Yima may refer to:

 Jamshid in Aryan mythology
 Yima, Henan, city under administration of Sanmenxia, China
 , town in Qingcheng County, Gansu, China
 , town in Panshi, Jilin, China